Maraghei may be,

Maraghei dialect of Tati

People
Mohammad Said Maraghei, Prime Minister of Iran
Rahmatollah Moghaddam Maraghei
Zeyn al-Abedin Maraghei